Flexivirga alba is a non-spore-forming bacterium from the genus of Flexivirga which has been isolated from soil near a wastewater treatment plant in Seki in Japan.

References

Further reading 
 

 

Micrococcales
Bacteria described in 2012